In chemistry, hydrogen halides (hydrohalic acids when in the aqueous phase) are diatomic, inorganic compounds that function as Arrhenius acids. The formula is HX where X is one of the halogens: fluorine, chlorine, bromine, iodine, or astatine. All known hydrogen halides are gases at Standard Temperature and Pressure.

Vs. hydrohalic acids
The hydrogen halides are diatomic molecules with no tendency to ionize in the gas phase (although liquified hydrogen fluoride is a polar solvent somewhat similar to water).  Thus, chemists distinguish hydrogen chloride from hydrochloric acid.  The former is a gas at room temperature that reacts with water to give the acid.  Once the acid has formed, the diatomic molecule can be regenerated only with difficulty, but not by normal distillation.  Commonly the names of the acid and the molecules are not clearly distinguished such that in lab jargon, "HCl" often means hydrochloric acid, not the gaseous hydrogen chloride.

Occurrence
Hydrogen chloride, in the form of hydrochloric acid, is a major component of gastric acid.

Hydrogen fluoride, chloride and bromide are also volcanic gases.

Synthesis
The direct reaction of hydrogen with fluorine and chlorine gives hydrogen fluoride and hydrogen chloride, respectively.  Industrially these gases are, however, produced by treatment of halide salts with sulfuric acid.  Hydrogen bromide arises when hydrogen and bromine are combined at high temperatures in the presence of a platinum catalyst.  The least stable hydrogen halide, HI, is produced less directly, by the reaction of iodine with hydrogen sulfide or with hydrazine.

Physical properties

The hydrogen halides are colourless gases at standard conditions for temperature and pressure (STP) except for hydrogen fluoride, which boils at 19 °C.  Alone of the hydrogen halides, hydrogen fluoride exhibits hydrogen bonding between molecules, and therefore has the highest melting and boiling points of the HX series. From HCl to HI the boiling point rises. This trend is attributed to the increasing  strength of intermolecular van der Waals forces, which correlates with numbers of electrons in the molecules.  Concentrated hydrohalic acid solutions produce visible white fumes. This mist arises from the formation of tiny droplets of their concentrated aqueous solutions of the hydrohalic acid.

Reactions
Upon dissolution in water, which is highly exothermic, the hydrogen halides give the corresponding acids.  These acids are very strong, reflecting their tendency to ionize in aqueous solution yielding hydronium ions (H3O+). With the exception of hydrofluoric acid, the hydrogen halides are strong acids, with acid strength increasing down the group.  Hydrofluoric acid is complicated because its strength depends on the concentration owing to the effects of homoconjugation.  As solutions in non-aqueous solvents, such as acetonitrile, the hydrogen halides are only modestly acidic however.

Similarly, the hydrogen halides react with ammonia (and other bases), forming ammonium halides:
HX + NH3   →   NH4X

In organic chemistry, the hydrohalogenation reaction is used to prepare halocarbons.  For example, chloroethane is produced by hydrochlorination of ethylene:
C2H4  +  HCl   →   CH3CH2Cl

See also
Pseudohalogen
Hypohalous acid
group 13 hydrides
group 14 hydrides
group 15 hydrides
group 16 hydrides

References

Nonmetal halides
Hydrogen compounds
Diatomic molecules